Breg pri Zagradcu is a small settlement east of Zagradec on the left bank of the Krka River in the Municipality of Ivančna Gorica in central Slovenia. The area is part of the historical region of Lower Carniola. The municipality is now included in the Central Slovenia Statistical Region.

Name
Breg pri Zagradcu was attested in written sources as Rayn in 1444 and Rain  1457. The name of the settlement was changed from Breg to Breg pri Zagradcu in 1953.

References

External links

Breg pri Zagradcu on Geopedia

Populated places in the Municipality of Ivančna Gorica